Woodmont is a mansion and hilltop estate of  in Gladwyne, a suburb of Philadelphia, Pennsylvania, United States. In 1953, it became the home of evangelist Father Divine, and the center of his International Peace Mission movement. It was declared a National Historic Landmark in 1998 for its well-preserved Chateau-style architecture, and for its association with Father Divine.

Alan Wood, Jr.

Woodmont was designed in 1891 by Quaker architect William Lightfoot Price in the French Gothic style for Alan Wood, Jr., a steel magnate and former U.S. Congressman. Overlooking the Schuylkill River, the industrial town of Conshohocken, Pennsylvania, and the Alan Wood Iron & Steel Company Plant, the chateauesque mansion was completed in 1894 at a cost of one-million dollars.

The site features views of 15 to 20 miles. The Schuylkill Expressway passes by the estate, hundreds of feet below.

The model for Woodmont was the George W. Vanderbilt mansion, Biltmore, in Asheville, North Carolina. Price had designed a nearby hotel for Vanderbilt, the Kenilworth Inn (1890–91), and was intimately familiar with the then-under-construction chateau.

Woodmont includes tennis courts, a swimming pool, stables, several outbuildings, greenhouses, a stream, and walking paths.

Alan Wood, Jr. occupied the estate for less than a decade. A year before his 1902 death, he sold it to his nephew, Richard G. Wood, who lived there for 28 years.

A description from 1897:
WOODMONT.--Alan Wood, Jr., owns the estate with the above name. The section around the house, including the gardens, is styled Woodmont Park. The house was constructed between 1891 and 1894. William L. Price, of Philadelphia, being the architect. The style is that of a French Gothic chateau. Stone from the vicinity furnished most of the walls, the cellar being cut out of the rock. Lieperville stone, with limestone trimmings, were used in facing, and the stable is from the stone quarried from the cellar. The site is 475 feet above tidewater, overlooking the Valley of the Schuylkill for fifteen or twenty miles around. The highest site in Montgomery County is on the Woodmont Farm, being twenty-five feet higher than the mansion site. There are neat lodge-houses.  Woodmont Farm contains about 100 acres, and Bellevue and Highland Farms, owned by Mr. Wood, adjoining, also contain about a hundred acres each. The Woodmont Farm had been owned by the Newberry family for a century before Mr. Wood purchased it in 1880. The Bellevue and Highland Farms were a part of the John Y. Crawford estate, and were bought from the estate by Mr. Wood in 1885. Highland Farm was well-named in old time from its elevated position. The farms are well-kept, and in the best condition. On Highland Farm was a stone mansion house, which Mr. Wood beautifully remodeled, and it has been rented to citizens yearly, furnished. Richard G. Wood, of Pittsburg , is dwelling there this summer. There is also a fine farm-house. The stone barn on Bellevue Farm is believed to be the finest one in Montgomery County, accommodating fifty cows and twenty-five horses; and hospital stalls are added for sick cows and horses for isolation.

Father Divine
The estate is today the center of the International Peace Mission movement. Father Divine, a self-proclaimed God and leader of the movement, was given the estate by a follower, John Devoute, in 1953. His followers renovated the mansion and placed an American flag prominently in front reflecting Father Divine's patriotism. They also added a garden like those on previous Peace Mission properties. An open house was held on September 10–12, 1953.

Followers visited Father Divine here until his death in 1965. All furnishings in Divine's rooms, including an antiquated television set, have been left as they were at his death. The estate is now a shrine to his life and a meeting place for his few remaining followers.

Visiting
Woodmont is open to the public on Sunday afternoons, from April to October. The guided tours are free of charge.

See also
List of National Historic Landmarks in Pennsylvania
National Register of Historic Places listings in Montgomery County, Pennsylvania

References

 William L. Price, "Details of Residence of Hon. Alan Wood, Jr., Woodmont, PA. ~ William L. Price, Architect," Architectural Review, vol. III, no. 8 (December 1894), p. 69, Plate XLVIII.
 Richard G. Wood III, Remembrances of Woodmont (unpublished manuscript, dated December 15, 1989). Copy at Woodmont.

External links

Photograph at Lower Merion Historical Society
Listing and photographs at Philadelphia Architects and Buildings

International Peace Mission movement
National Historic Landmarks in Pennsylvania
Lower Merion Township, Pennsylvania
Houses on the National Register of Historic Places in Pennsylvania
Houses completed in 1894
Museums in Montgomery County, Pennsylvania
Philadelphia Main Line
Historic house museums in Pennsylvania
Gothic Revival architecture in Pennsylvania
Houses in Montgomery County, Pennsylvania
Religious museums in Pennsylvania
National Register of Historic Places in Montgomery County, Pennsylvania